The Nationalist Party was a political party in Thailand founded on 6 February 1956  by Net Poonwiwat was leader and Paisal Chatbood was secretary-general. The Nationalist Party won four seats in the general election of February 1957, which decreased to one seat in another general election held in December that year. Following a coup d'etat on 20 October 1958, the party was ordered to be dissolved by the military junta.

References 

Defunct political parties in Thailand
Political parties disestablished in 1958
Nationalist parties in Asia
1956 establishments in Thailand
Political parties established in 1956